Batallas Municipality is the third municipal section of the Los Andes Province in the  La Paz Department, Bolivia. Its capital is Batallas.

Geography 
The Cordillera Real traverses the Batallas Municipality. Some of the highest mountains of the municipality are listed below:

Languages 
The languages spoken in the Batallas Municipality are mainly Aymara, Spanish and Quechua.

See also 
 Jach'a Jawira
 Janq'u Quta
 Lawrawani Lake
 Q'ara Quta

References 

 https://web.archive.org/web/20090218081859/http://obd.descentralizacion.gov.bo/municipal/fichas/ (inactive link)

Municipalities of La Paz Department (Bolivia)